San Marcos, Colombia may refer to:

San Marcos, Antioquia
San Marcos, Sucre

See also
 San Marcos (disambiguation)